Browne Bushell (bap. 1609, d. 1651), was an English Civil War-era naval officer. He initially sided with the Roundheads. On the night of 15 August 1641 he led a small parliamentary force in a cutting out operation to capture the Henrietta Marie in Portsmouth harbour. In 1643 he switched to the royalist side. He was executed for treason in March 1651.

References

Further reading
Jack Binns, 'Bushell, Browne (bap. 1609, d. 1651)’, Oxford Dictionary of National Biography, Oxford University Press,Sept 2004; online edn, Jan 2008
Jack Binns, "Captain Browne Bushell: North Sea adventurer and pirate", Northern History, 27 (1991), 90–105.

People from Whitby
1651 deaths
People executed under the Interregnum (England) for treason against England
Year of birth unknown
Parliamentarian military personnel of the English Civil War
Executed people from North Yorkshire
Royalist military personnel of the English Civil War
Military personnel from Yorkshire
People executed under the Interregnum (England) by decapitation
English privateers